The Gumps is an American radio sitcom broadcast from 1931 until 1937, mostly on CBS Radio based on the popular Sidney Smith newspaper comic strip The Gumps.  It was the first radio adaptation of comics.

Concept

The Gumps are portrayed as a cranky couple. The biographer of writer Irwin Shaw describes them as the "Archie Bunker and Edith Bunker of their day."

History

The show first aired on WGN Chicago from 1931 until November 5, 1934. From 1934 until 1937 it aired on CBS Radio. WGN executive Ben McCanna believed that a dramatic serial could work on radio just as it did in newspapers. When he approached Gosden and Correll to adapt The Gumps to radio, they declined and instead devised their own characters for the 1926–27 radio serial, Sam 'n' Henry. After reworking these characters for Amos 'n' Andy in 1928–29, while borrowing certain elements from The Gumps, they were on their way to becoming millionaires, and the radio serial format they created soon became the model for many other serialized radio dramas.

After The Gumps were finally heard on WGN in 1931, the series moved to CBS for a four-year run (1934–1937), produced and directed by Himan Brown with scripts by Irwin Shaw. Shaw had been scripting the Dick Tracy radio series, when Brown asked him if he thought he could write comedy. Brown later said, "He was sensational". Karo Syrup and Pebeco toothpaste/tooth powder were the sponsors.

Cast
 Andy Gump: Jack Boyle (actor), Wilmer Walter
 Min Gump: Dorothy Denvir, Agnes Moorehead
 Chester Gump: Charles Flynn (actor), Lester Jay, Jackie Kelk
 Tilda the maid: Bess Flynn

Legacy

According to historian Elizabeth McLeod in the "Andy Gump to Andy Brown" section of her popular culture essay, and her book, The Original Amos 'n' Andy, "The Gumps" comic strip was the forefather of radio and TV sitcoms and serialized dramas. It was also the first radio show based on a comic strip.

Sources

American comedy radio programs
1931 radio programme debuts
1937 radio programme endings
CBS Radio programs
Radio programs based on comic strips
Radio programs about families